The City of Lost Children is an adventure game developed and published by Psygnosis in 1997. It based on the film of the same title and was released in the United States and in parts of Europe for the PlayStation console first and then MS-DOS. The latter is a straight port of the PlayStation version. Players take on the role of the film character Miette.

Reception

On GameRankings the PC version holds a score of 60% based on three reviews, while the PlayStation version holds a score of 54.50% based on four reviews.

The game received mediocre reviews. Reviewers generally remarked that the graphics are stunningly beautiful and atmospheric, but criticized the excessive difficulty of finding objects and the slow pace. A Next Generation critic explained, "To pick up an item, you must stand directly on top of it, a problem when most of the important objects aren't out in plain sight. You'll find yourself looking in every nook and cranny just to make sure you didn't miss something. Even then, the vast majority of items are found almost by accident ..." Josh Smith of GameSpot further remarked, "The game's puzzles are arbitrary and not particularly intuitive. Trade the marbles for a sleeping potion? Go figure. Put a bone in a cash register to short out the security system on a safe? Come on. The lack of deduction required by the game encourages the kind of random gameplay that can only be described as frustrating. Solutions to puzzles rarely yield a sense of accomplishment since more often than not they are solved through happenstance, not reasoning."

Shawn Smith and Sushi-X of Electronic Gaming Monthly had a somewhat more positive reaction; though they noted the same key flaws as other critics, they focused more on how well the game recreated the world of the film, with Smith commenting, "The cinemas are done well, and the rendered city gives the impression of really being in [a] dirty, semi-futuristic alternate reality." However, their co-reviewers Dan Hsu and Crispin Boyer called it "A unique game that masochists should check out" and "heavy on atmosphere but lean on fun", respectively. GamePros The Rookie concluded, "If you're determined to play, take an evening to rent both the movie and the game to see which goes first, your eyesight or your sanity."

Notes

References

External links
 The City of Lost Children at GameFAQs
 The City of Lost Children at Giant Bomb
 The City of Lost Children at MobyGames

1997 video games
Adventure games
DOS games
PlayStation (console) games
Psygnosis games
Steampunk video games
Video games based on films
Video games developed in France
Video games featuring female protagonists
Windows games